Franco Patricio Morales Ordenes (born 30 June 1992) is a Chilean professional basketball player for Las Ánimas de Valdivia of the Liga Nacional de Básquetbol de Chile.

Professional career
Morales signed with Las Ánimas de Valdivia in 2016. In August 2018, he signed for four more seasons.

National team
He has been a member of Chile's national basketball team on many occasions, including the 2019 FIBA Basketball World Cup qualification.

References

External links
FIBA profile
Profile at Eurobasket.com
Profile at RealGM.com

1992 births
Living people
Chilean expatriate sportspeople in Colombia
Chilean men's basketball players
Point guards
People from Talca
Chile men's national basketball team players